Tamarindo is a district of the Santa Cruz canton, in the Guanacaste province of Costa Rica, located on the Nicoya Peninsula. The town of Tamarindo is the largest developed beach town in Guanacaste. Main attractions in the area are surfing and eco-tourism.

History 
Tamarindo was created on 27 November 1995 by Decreto Ejecutivo (English: Executive Order) 24820-G.

Geography 

Settlements
Besides Tamarindo, towns in the district include Villarreal, Santa Rosa, Garita Nueva, Hernández and San José de Pinilla.

Villareal

The nearby town of Villareal has a both a public elementary school and a public high school, two full size soccer fields, multiple restaurants, two large stores, multiple hardware stores, a police station, a church, several car repair shops and a gas station.

Langosta

Just east of the centre of Tamarindo, there is a three-way intersection. To the left is the road that leads to the Banco Nacional de Costa Rica, and also a secondary exit from Tamarindo. To the right is the road that leads to Langosta.

Tourism

Beaches
Playa Tamarindo is a long, rocky beach with excellent waves near the mouth of the estuary. Currents can be strong, especially on a falling tide. Tamarindo has two main breaks for advanced surfers: Pico Pequeño, a rocky point to the right of the Hotel Tamarindo Diriá, and the excellent river mouth break across from Cabinas Tsunami called El Estero. The biggest waves can reach a height of up to 12 feet, although this is a rare occurrence and is only seen during June, July and August.

The beaches in the area are generally clean and recent efforts by the government and local business organizations are proving themselves. While the beach has not regained its Blue Flag Status, in September 2008 it did get a clean bill of health from the Costa Rican government. The town is trying to regain its Blue Flag Status.

Fishing
Tamarindo is known for world-class fishing tourism, and a variety of captains and charters services are available. Costa Rica requires a fishing license from the INCOPESCA (Instituto Costarricense de Pesca y Acuicultura), the government agency that manages, regulates and promotes fisheries and aquaculture.

Demographics 

Transportation

Road transportation 
The district is covered by the following road routes:
 National Route 152
 National Route 155

Airport
Tamarindo is the most accessible location along the northern Pacific coast of Costa Rica with an airstrip.

Liberia International Airport is the closest international airport to Tamarindo, about an hour away.

Public transportation
There is a scheduled daily bus service to and from San José, as well as a paved highway to San José with driving time of 3.5 to 6 hours depending on traffic.

Gallery

See also
 Tourism in Costa Rica

References

External links

 Tamarindo Beach Videos
 Information about surfing conditions in Tamarindo
 Tamarindo Directory
 Tamarindo Visitors Guide
 Incopesca

Districts of Guanacaste Province
Populated places in Guanacaste Province
Districts of Costa Rica
Surfing locations in Costa Rica